Paul McGuigan is the name of:

 Paul McGuigan (musician) (born 1971), aka Guigsy, English musician, former bassist in the band Oasis
 Paul McGuigan (filmmaker) (born 1963), Scottish filmmaker